Matthew or Matt Thompson may refer to:

Entertainment
 Matthew Thompson (actor), American actor
 Matthew Thompson (writer), American-born Australian writer
 Matt Thompson (animator), American producer, writer, and voice actor in animation
 Matt Thompson (film director) (born 1984), American film director, producer, screenwriter and actor

Sports
 Matthew Thompson (cricketer) (born 1974), English cricketer
 Matt Thompson (soccer) (born 1982), Australian footballer
 Matt Thompson (rugby union) (born 1982), English rugby union player

Other
 Matthew William Thompson (1820–1891), British MP for Bradford, West Yorkshire, 1867–1868
 Matt Thompson (priest) (born 1968), British Anglican priest
 Matt Thompson (journalist) (born 1980), American journalist and member of the Center for Investigative Reporting

See also
Mat Roy Thompson (1874–1962), civil engineer and builder of Scotty's Castle
Matthew Thomson (disambiguation)